Alarums and Excursions (A&E) is an amateur press association (APA) started in June 1975 by Lee Gold; publication continues to the present day. It was one of the first publications to focus solely on role-playing games.

History
In 1964, Bruce Pelz of the Los Angeles Science Fiction Society (LASFS) began a monthly amateur press association known as APA-L. In 1974, with the publication of Dungeons & Dragons by TSR, Inc., articles and comments about the new roleplaying game began to fill the pages of APA-L. Pelz felt the discussion was taking up too much space, and he asked Lee Gold to start a new APA that would take this material and focus entirely on roleplaying games. The first issue of Alarums and Excursions appeared in June 1975, the title taken from an Elizabethan drama stage direction that moved soldiers across a stage.

In addition to removing roleplaying games discussion out of APA-L, the initial aim of the publication was to prevent roleplaying games from becoming so divergent that people from different cities could not participate in games together.

The June 2017 collation of Alarums and Excursions was number 500, with a color cover drawn by Lee Moyer and printed by Rob Heinsoo.

Contents
Each issue is a collection of contributions from different authors, often featuring game design discussions, rules variants, write-ups of game sessions, reviews, and comments on others contributions. 

Although game reports and social reactions are common parts of many A&E contributions, it has also, over the years, become a testing ground for new ideas on the development of the RPG as a genre and an art form. The idea that role-playing games are an art form took strong root in this zine, and left a lasting impression on many of the RPG professionals who contributed. The 1992 role-playing game Over the Edge was inspired by discussions in A&E.

Over the years, contributors have included: 
 Terry K. Amthor
 Wilf K. Backhaus
 Scott Bennie
 Greg Costikyan
 Doc Cross
 John M. Ford
 E. Gary Gygax
 Andrew Gelman
 David A. Hargrave
 Rob Heinsoo
 John Eric Holmes
 Wes Ives
 Robin Laws
 Nicole Lindroos
 Stephen R. Marsh
 Phil McGregor
 Dave Nalle
 Mark Rein·Hagen
 Ken Rolston
 John T. Sapienza, Jr.
 Lawrence M. Schoen
 Edward E. Simbalist
 Jonathan Tweet
 Erick Wujcik
 John Nephew
 Spike Y Jones

Reception
In the February 1976 issue of Strategic Review (Issue 6), Gary Gygax complimented the new APA, calling it "an excellent source of ideas, inspirations and fun." Although Gygax felt some of the contributors were "woefully lacking in background", and the quality of printing varied dramatically from issue to issue, he concluded, "For all of its faults, it is far and away the best D&D 'zine, and well worth reading. See for yourself why it rates a Major Triumph."

In the June 1981 edition of Dragon (Issue #50), Dave Nalle reviewed Alarums and Excursions after its 63rd issue (November 1980), and although he found the writing style "a bit stuffy", with a "tendency for the writers to pat each other on the back", he still called it "the top APA publication... This is a very well run APA and features many of the leading thinkers in fantasy gaming."

Awards
To date, Alarums and Excursions has been a winner of the Charles Roberts/Origins Award four times:
 "Best Amateur Adventure Gaming Magazine" in 1984 
 "Best Amateur Game Magazine" in 1999 
 "Best Amateur Game Periodical" in 2000 and 2001

References

External links
 Alarums and Excursions page
 Lee Gold's index of APA-L's pre-A&E D&D-related content

Fanzines
Magazines established in 1975
Organizations established in 1975
Origins Award winners
Role-playing game magazines
Science fiction organizations
Magazines published in Los Angeles